Bella the Savage (Spanish: Bella, la salvaje) is a 1953 Cuban-Spanish musical comedy film directed by Raúl Medina and Roberto Rey and starring Blanquita Amaro and Néstor de Barbosa.

Cast
 Blanquita Amaro 
 Néstor de Barbosa 
 Roberto Rey 
 Silvia Morgan 
 Luis Arroyo 
 Pedro Tena
 Mario Moreno
 Carmen Porcel
 Justo M. Barreto
 Delia Luna
 Esperanza Roy 
 Rosita Teide
 Aníbal Vela
 Eulalia Tenorio
 Celina
 Reutilio

References

Bibliography 
 Alfonso J. García Osuna. The Cuban Filmography: 1897 through 2001. McFarland, 2003.

External links 
 

1953 films
1950s Spanish-language films
Cuban musical comedy films
1953 musical comedy films
Spanish musical comedy films
Cuban black-and-white films
Spanish black-and-white films
Films scored by Augusto Algueró